Lesli Kay  (born Lesli Kay Pushkin on June 13, 1965 in Charleston, West Virginia) is an American actress, who is known primarily for her roles on the CBS soap operas As the World Turns and The Bold and the Beautiful.

Career
At age 12, she had the first individual girl's bat mitzvah in the state of West Virginia.  She moved to New York City at the age of 15 to pursue a modeling career. Kay later worked at MTV and won $27,500 on Wheel of Fortune.

In 1997 she made her daytime debut as Molly Conlan on As the World Turns. For some time the character was not very popular due to Molly's villainous behavior, but she eventually won a 2001 Daytime Emmy for Best Supporting Actress in addition to charming viewers during her romance with Jake McKinnon (Tom Eplin). When Jake was killed off in 2002, Molly again became adrift, and Kay left the show in early 2004 after a number of promised storylines never appeared. Kay popped up a few months later to recast the popular, brassy character of Lois Cerullo on General Hospital. Kay (and the resurrected character of Lois) exited GH in early 2005 after mutually agreeing to part ways with the show.

In November 2005, Kay assumed the role of Felicia Forrester on The Bold and the Beautiful, taking over for Colleen Dion after a year's absence. Bold and the Beautiful Head Writer Bradley Bell had planned to kill her character off from cancer. However, a huge fan outpouring, including petitions and numerous letters, in addition to Kay's job of making the role her own, convinced Bell to keep Kay on the cast. Her character, Felicia Forrester was resurrected from the dead. Lesli Kay invested herself into the cancer storyline so much that she shaved her head for the role. In 2007, Kay was nominated for Outstanding Supporting Actress at the 34th Annual Daytime Emmy Awards but lost to Genie Francis.

In 2008, it was announced that Kay would crossover to The Young and the Restless, in what was considered to be a semi-permanent basis. Kay's crossover to Y&R was short-lived and she returned to her home series. In 2009, it was announced that Kay would make history in becoming the first actress to hold two roles on two separate coasts, when she was announced to be returning to the role of Molly on As the World Turns, while maintaining her role as Felicia on a recurring status. She stayed with As the World Turns until the show's final episode on September 17, 2010. Kay continued making appearances on B&B until 2014, and then reprised the role in 2016.

Filmography

Television

References

External links

SoapCentral profile

American soap opera actresses
Actors from Charleston, West Virginia
1965 births
Living people
Daytime Emmy Award winners
Daytime Emmy Award for Outstanding Supporting Actress in a Drama Series winners
21st-century American women